The women's heptathlon event at the 2014 African Championships in Athletics was held on August 12–13 on Stade de Marrakech.

Medalists

Results

100 metres hurdles
Wind:Heat 1: -0.3 m/s, Heat 2: -0.6 m/s

High jump

Shot put

200 metres
Wind:Heat 1: -0.1 m/s, Heat 2: -0.3 m/s

Long jump

Javelin throw

800 metres

Final standings

References

2014 African Championships in Athletics
Combined events at the African Championships in Athletics
2014 in women's athletics